Margate Football Club is an English association football club based in the seaside resort of Margate, Kent.  The club was founded in 1896 and played only friendlies and cup matches until 1909, when the team joined the Thanet and District League. Two years later Margate joined the Kent League, initially also playing in the Thanet League due to the county league's small fixture list, before stepping up to the Southern League in 1933. After four seasons at this level, however, the club was forced to resign on financial grounds and return to the Kent League. Margate returned to the Southern League in 1959 and remained there until 2001 when they gained promotion to the Football Conference, the highest level of English non-League football. During their stay at this level they were forced to groundshare with other clubs due to drawn-out and problematic redevelopment work at their Hartsdown Park ground. This led to the club being expelled from the Conference National in 2004 for failing to meet the division's stadium requirements. After one season in the Conference South the club was relegated to the Isthmian League.

The team, nicknamed "The Gate", have to date reached the third round proper of England's premier cup competition, the FA Cup, on two occasions. The club's best performance in the FA Trophy, the main cup competition specifically for non-League clubs, was a run to the quarter-final stage in 2001–02.

Seasons

Key

Division shown in bold when it changes due to promotion, relegation or league reorganisation. Top scorer shown in bold when he set or equalled a club record.

Key to league record
P – games played
W – games won
D – games drawn
L – games lost
F – goals for
A – goals against
Pts – points
Pos – final position

Key to rounds
– indicates that Margate did not enter the competition in the given season
Grp – group stage
QR1 – first qualifying round
QR2 – second qualifying round, etc.
REP – extra-preliminary round
RP – preliminary round
R1 – first round
R2 – second round, etc.
QF – quarter-final
SF – semi-final
n/a – not applicable

Key to divisions
Conf – Conference
ConfS/NLS – Conference South/National League South (renamed in 2015)
IsP – Isthmian League Premier Division
KL – Kent League
KL1 – Kent League Division One
KL2E – Kent League Division Two East
SL – Southern League
SLP – Southern League Premier Division
SLS – Southern League Southern Division
SL1 – Southern League Division One
SL1S – Southern League Division One South
SLE – Southern League Eastern Section
SLC – Southern League Central Section
SLMW – Southern League Midweek Section
TDL – Thanet and District League

Key to cups
CLC – Conference League Cup
EFC – Eastern Floodlit Cup
ILC – Isthmian League Cup
ITGC – Isle of Thanet Gazette Cup
KAC – Kent Amateur Cup
KFC – Kent Floodlit Cup
KFL – Kent Floodlit League
KFT – Kent Floodlit Trophy
KJC – Kent Junior Cup
KLC – Kent League Cup
KMT – Kent Messenger Trophy
KSC – Kent Senior Cup
KSS – Kent Senior Shield
MDCC – Margate and District Charity Cup
SLC – Southern League Cup
SLCH – Southern League Championship Match
TMC – Thames and Medway Cup

Notes
A.  Margate entered the FA Amateur Cup until the First World War. The club entered the FA Trophy from its creation in 1969.

B.  Margate's first ever match was a friendly against Wye F.C. on 28 October 1896.

C.  Margate's first round match against Folkestone Post Office was the club's first ever competitive match. It was ordered to be replayed as Margate had fielded an ineligible player.

D.  Pearce also scored twice in a match against Broadstairs Town which was abandoned due to fog and ordered to be replayed.

E.  Fordham also scored one goal in a match against Ramsgate Town which was declared void and ordered to be replayed for unknown reasons.

F.  Matches in both leagues are considered to have been first team matches.

G.  Sparrow also scored three goals in a match against Royal Army Service Corps which was later declared void when that team resigned from the league.

H.  Copp also scored one goal in a match against 1st Middlesex Regiment which was later declared void when that team resigned from the league.

I.  At the end of the 1922–23 season Margate were suspended from the league for financial irregularities and subsequently folded. The club reformed a year later and re-entered the league.

J.  Margate were knocked out of the Kent League Cup after losing 3–0 to Ashford Railway Works in a league match which it was agreed would also count as a League Cup match.

K.  Stennings also scored one goal in a match against Catford Southend which was later declared void when that team resigned from the league.

L.  Margate folded for a second time at the end of the 1927–28 due to heavy debts. The club reformed a year later and returned to the league.

M.  Following their Kent League title win, Margate successfully applied for membership of the Southern League and were placed in the Eastern Section. They continued to field a team in the Kent League, and that league placed a requirement on the club to field its strongest team, therefore both leagues are considered to have been first team competitions.

N.  Margate's FA Cup fourth round qualifying match against Folkestone was abandoned due to fog, but as it was subsequently discovered that Margate had fielded an ineligible player, the tie was awarded to Folkestone rather than a replay ordered.

O.  Margate won the overall Southern League championship by defeating Western Section winners Plymouth Argyle Reserves 3–1 in a play-off match, which was held over until September 1936.

P.  Margate resigned from the Southern League in 1937 for financial reasons and returned to the Kent League.

Q.  Margate folded for a third time after the 1937–38 season due to debt. Once again, the club reformed a year later.

R.  The Kent League was abandoned after Margate's first match due to the outbreak of the Second World War and replaced with the Kent Regional League, which is not generally included in official statistics. This league was itself abandoned before the end of the season, although Margate had already played all their matches, with a record of P20 W7 D5 L8 F47 A44 Pts19.

S.  Margate drew 2–2 with Erith & Belvedere but the competition was abandoned before the replay took place.

T.  The Kent Senior Cup and Senior Shield competitions continued throughout the season. Margate reached the semi-final of the Shield but failed to turn up for the match and were expelled from the competition.

U.  Margate and Folkestone were declared joint winners of the Kent Senior Shield after a 1–1 draw in the final.

V.  Margate played one match in the Kent Senior Cup, but it is unclear which round this represented.

W.  Margate played three matches in the Kent Senior Shield, but it is unclear which rounds these represented.

X.  Margate were technically not relegated as the Southern League Premier Division was scrapped in 1979 due to the formation of the Alliance Premier League. The league was instead reorganised into two parallel divisions, the Southern Division and the Midland Division, with Margate playing in the Southern Division.

Y.  Having finished bottom of the table, Margate did not qualify for a place in the Southern League Premier Division, which was reformed for the 1982–83 season. They remained in the Southern Division, which became the second tier of the league.

Z.  Margate and Ramsgate were declared joint winners of the Isle of Thanet Gazette Cup after the match finished 1–1.

AA.  Although Margate finished in 16th position, the club was relegated to the newly formed Conference South due to not being able to meet the stadium requirements of what was now designated the Conference National.

AB.  Margate were deducted 10 points for entering administrative receivership.

References

Seasons
Margate